Strikeforce: Tank vs. Buentello was a mixed martial arts event held on October 7, 2006. The event was held by Strikeforce and took place at the Save Mart Center in Fresno, California.

Background
This event featured the MMA debut of future UFC Heavyweight Champion Cain Velasquez.

Wesley Correira was scheduled to fight Ruben Villareal at the event but withdrew due to medical reasons and thus the bout was scrapped.

Results

See also
 Strikeforce
 List of Strikeforce champions
 List of Strikeforce events
 2006 in Strikeforce

References

Tank vs. Buentello
2006 in mixed martial arts
Mixed martial arts in California
Sports competitions in Fresno, California
2006 in sports in California